Habbin is a surname. Notable people with the surname include:

David Habbin, English opera singer
Dick Habbin (born 1949), English footballer and manager

See also
Babbin